Angel City may refer to:

Music
Angel City (electronic music group), dance project of Zentveld & Oomen
Angel City, alternative name of Australian band The Angels
Angel City (album), a 2012 album by Roscoe Mitchell
"Angel City", a song from the 1991 Motörhead album 1916
Angel City Outcasts, punk rock group
Angel City Chorale, choir in Los Angeles

Places
Angel City, Florida, location in the US
Angel City, Texas, an unincorporated community
Angel City, California, a fictional city in which the computer and video games Juiced and Juiced: Eliminator are set
Angels Camp, California, called "Angel City" on some archaic maps
Los Angeles, California, referred to as the "City of Angels" or occasionally "Angel City"

Roller Derby
Angel City Derby, Los Angeles-based roller derby league

Soccer
Angel City FC, Los Angeles-based women's soccer team in the National Women's Soccer League (NWSL)
Angel City Brigade, LA Galaxy support group

Theatre and film
Angel City (play), a 1976 play by Sam Shepard
Angel City (1977 film), a comedy film
Angel City (1980 film), a television film directed by Philip Leacock and Steve Carver

Other
Angel City Alliance, Los Angeles-based nonprofit organization working with people with disabilities 
Angel City Sports, Los Angeles-based nonprofit adaptive sports organization
Angel City Games, Los Angeles-based nonprofit adaptive sports games

See also
Angels City